Foshan No.1 High School (Simplified Chinese: 佛山市第一中学), also known as No.1 Middle School of Foshan, Foshan No.1 Middle School, FSYZ (pinyin abbreviation), is one of the key high schools in Guangdong, China. It was initially founded in 1913 as Wa Ying College and transformed into the current school in August 1955. During the Cultural Revolution, the school was once called Shuibengchang Middle School of Foshan (Simplified Chinese: 佛山水泵厂中学) but restored afterward.

Currently, the school has 75 classes. From Grade 10–12, each grade has 24 classes. The Junior High School Department of Tibetan Students has three classes. The total number of students is approximately 3400 and the number of full-time teachers is about 250. The school is the only regular boarding senior high school directly subordinates to Foshan Education Bureau. It is also one of the Exemplary Schools accredited by MOE.

History

Qing Dynasty (1853-1911) 

In 1853, the South China diocese of British Methodist Church established its first church and an affiliated school in Guangzhou. After that, several schools were established by the church in Guangdong. In 1909, Rev. S. George Tope, a priest of the church purchased 20 acres of land in Wenchangsha, Foshan for school establishment.

Republic of China （1911-1949） 
In 1912, the Methodist Church began to establish a school on the purchased land. In 1913, the construction was completed. The first principal was Rev. C.A. Gimblett. In memory of Dr. Haigh's contribution to Chinese Education, the school was first named "Haigh College". Soon after its opening, the name was changed into "Wa Ying College", which indicates that the school represents a combination of Chinese and British Education (in Chinese, "Wa"華 means China and "Ying"英 means Britain). At the time, the school recruited male students only.

In 1920, Rev. Arthur H. Bray (黎伯廉), the second principal of Wa Ying Middle School, raised money for expanding the school and building a new school recruiting female students. The new girl school was established in 1923.

During the World War II, the school underwent significant changes. The boy school and the girl school were combined due to the shortage of schoolhouses. In order to avoid the Japanese invaders, the school has moved to several places including Hong Kong, which laid a foundation for the establishment of Hong Kong-based Wa Ying College (華英中學) in 1969. After the war, Wa Ying Middle School moved back to its original site in Wenchangsha, Foshan and re-opened in November 1946.

People's Republic of China (1949-today) 
After the establishment of the People's Republic of China, Wa Ying Middle School was confiscated by the government and transformed into the current public school "No.1 Middle School of Foshan". At first, the school was a public junior and senior high school with students from grade 7 to 12. In 1999, the junior high school department was separated from the school and became an independent junior high school called Foshan Huaying School. Since then, Foshan No.1 High School has only had students from grade 10-12 (except for Tibetan Department).

In October 1995, the school was assigned to open a Junior High School Department of Tibetan Students (also called Tibetan Department) by MOE. Students recruited from Tibet attend the school during grades 7–9.

On December 8, 2013, the school celebrated its 100th anniversary.

Campus and Buildings 
The campus area of Foshan No.1 High School is about 200 acres and the floor area is about 112,600  m2.

The buildings in the campus can be categorized into traditional type built in Wa Ying Middle School era and modern type built in No.1 High School era. The modern type includes the administrative building, library, main teaching building (west area), comprehensive building (east area), art building, sports center (new gym), auditorium (old gym), and students' dormitory buildings. The traditional type includes old principal office, old library (also known as "coffin alley" 棺材巷, now it has become alumni center), the white house (now foreign teacher dormitory), the red house (now female teacher dormitory), bell tower (now school clinic), old teaching building (now dining hall staff dormitory), and old dormitory building (now male teacher dormitory). Due to their century-long history, these traditional and historical type buildings are all under the legitimate protection from the government.

Other infrastructure in the school includes one 400m stadium, two swimming pools, 10 outdoor basketball courts, six computer laboratories, 10 physics laboratories, 10 chemistry laboratories, 10 biology laboratories, and eight lecture halls.

Academics 
As a topnotch senior high school in Guangdong, Foshan No.1 High School is prestigious for its academic excellence. Its admission process is highly competitive: only about 1% of all grade nine students in Foshan are able to enter this school every year.

National Higher Education Entrance Examination (Gaokao) 
In 2013 Gaokao, 10 students under science or art divisions ranked top 100 in the province, one of whom ranked 1st under the art division with a total score of 693. 72.8% of the students scored above the division I college borderline (the overall rate in the whole province is about 10%) and 98.6% of the students scored above the division II college borderline.

In 2014 Gaokao, 72.8% of the students scored above the division I college borderline. Meanwhile, both of the 1st students in Foshan under science and art divisions are from No.1 High School.

In 2015 Gaokao, 79.4% of the students scored above the division I college borderline.

In 2016 Gaokao, five students under both divisions ranked top 100 in the province. 87.5% of the students scored above the division I college borderline and 99.12% scored above the division II borderline.

In 2021 Gaokao, 5 students under physics division ranked top 50 in the province and 4 under history division ranked top 50 in the province. 12 students are 95.2% of the students scored above the division I college borderline.

Competitions 
Every year students of No.1 High School of Foshan won awards from national academic competitions including National Senior High School Mathematics Competition, National High School Student Physics Competition, etc. In 2011, students won 34 1st prizes in different national STEM competitions.

Clubs and Organizations

Music and Performance Art 
 Wind Ensemble
 Dance Group 
 Choir 
 Electric Music Club
 String Club
 Magic Club
 Chinese Folk Music Club
 Penbeat Club
 Street Dancing Club

Drama and Opera 
 Yongfeng Club of Drama
 Cantonese Opera Club

STEM 
 Galaxy Club of Science and Technology
 Design Club

Social Science 
 Model United Nations Club (MUN)
 JA Economics Club (JA经济社)
 Psychology Association (PA)

Volunteering 
 Little Bee Volunteering Club
 Red Cross Society

Communication 
 Television Station
 Feisheng Broadcasting Station

Sports 
 Football Club
 Bicycle Club
 Martial Club
 Soccer Team
 Basketball Team
 Volleyball Team
 Swimming Team
 Track and Field Team
 Orienteering Team

Language and Culture 
 Canglang Club of Literature()
 Japanese Language Club
 Western Culture and Art Club
 English Association (EA)

Fine Art and Calligraphy 
 Pottery Club
 "Hydrogen Industry" 3D Model Club
 Photography Club
 DIY Club
 Lingyin Club of ACG
 Qingquan Club of Calligraphy and Painting 
 Movie Appreciation Club
 K Pop Dance Club

Student Government 
 The Student Union
 Communist Youth League Committee (共青团委员会)

Other 
 Chess Club
 Deductive Reasoning Club
 Yoyo Club
 Horizon Traveler Association
 Man vs Wild Club

Alumni 
 Sinn Sing Hoi - Musician, Composer
 Peng Jiamu - Biochemist, Explorer
 Ye Xuanping - Chinese Politician
 Steven Cheung - Economist

References 

High schools in Guangdong
Buildings and structures in Foshan
Boarding schools in China